The Bro Park Sprint Championship is a Listed flat horse race in Sweden open to thoroughbreds aged three years or older. It is run at Bro Park over a distance of 1,150 metres (about 5¾ furlongs), and it is scheduled to take place each year in September.

History
The event was originally held at Ulriksdal as the Ulriksdallöpning. It was established in 1924, and was initially contested by horses aged two or older over 1,100 metres.

The race was transferred to Täby's Stockholm Cup International meeting in the early 1980s. For a period it was known as the Täby International Sprinter Stakes.

The Täby Open Sprint Championship was given Group 3 status in 1998. It was downgraded to Listed level in 2009. Täby Racecourse closed in May 2016 and the race was transferred to its replacement, Bro Park, from the 2016 running and renamed the Bro Park Sprint Championship.

Records
Most successful horse since 1960 (2 wins):
 Kapten Moss – 1977, 1978
 Simon Sacc – 1986, 1988
 Calrissian – 2008, 2009
 Easy Road - 2015, 2016

Leading jockey since 1960 (3 wins):
 Gunnar Nordling – Kapten Moss (1978), Itsabrahma (1991), Waquaas (2000)
 Rafael Schistl – Calrissian (2009), Giant Sandman (2011), Elusive Time (2012)
 Jacob Johansen - Alcohuaz (2010), Ragazzo (2014), General De Vega (2021)

Leading trainer since 1960 (4 wins):

 Niels Petersen - Francis (2007), Beat Baby (2013), Tinnitus (2017), Could Be King (2022)

Winners since 1990

Earlier winners

 1960: Desert Song
 1961: Popular
 1962: Slabang
 1963: Bow Tie
 1964: no race
 1965: San Michele
 1966–71: no race
 1972: Rebellico
 1973–74: no race
 1975: Ruling Party
 1976: Chin Chin
 1977: Kapten Moss
 1978: Kapten Moss
 1979: Modern Pleasure
 1980: Old Dominion
 1981: Music Streak
 1982: Doc Marten
 1983: Coquito's Friend
 1984: Kirchner
 1985: Powder Keg
 1986: Simon Sacc
 1987: Burhaain
 1988: Simon Sacc
 1989: My Corncrake

See also

 List of Scandinavian flat horse races
 Recurring sporting events established in 1924 – this race is included under its original title, Ulriksdallöpning.

References
 Racing Post:
 , 
 galopp-sieger.de – Open Sprint Championship.
 horseracingintfed.com – International Federation of Horseracing Authorities – Race Detail (2005).
 ovrevoll.no – Stockholm Cup International / Täby Open Sprint Championship.
 pedigreequery.com – Täby Open Sprint Championship – Täby.

Open sprint category horse races
Horse races in Sweden
Autumn events in Sweden